Haleva or haliva is a fried dough turnover filled with either potatoes or Circassian cheese.

Variations
Haliva stuffed with cottage cheese (Helive q'wey lhalhe delhu)
Haliva stuffed with potato (Helive ch'ert'of delhu)
Haliva stuffed with potato and cheese (Helive ch'ert'ofre q'weyre delhu)
Haliva stuffed with haricot beans (Heliva jesh delhu)
Haliva stuffed with pears (Helive q'wzch delhu)

See also

 Chebureki
 Qutab
 Lörtsy
 Börek
 Gözleme
 Puri
 Kalitsounia
 Calzone
 Curry puff
 Empanada
 Khuushuur
 Lángos
 Momo
 Pastel
 Pasty
 Plăcintă
 Puff pastry
 Samosa
 

Circassian cuisine
Deep fried foods
Savoury pies